Azonine is an unsaturated heterocycle of nine atoms, with a nitrogen replacing a carbon at one position. A variety of derivatives have been synthesised.  It is considered to possess a considerable amount of aromatic stability.  It and C9H9– are the largest monocyclic all-cis ring systems to be aromatic and close to planar.  Due to a balance between angle strain (~20°) and aromaticity, a planar conformation and distorted conformation are very close in energy and the two are observable as an equilibrium mixture in the solution phase in acetone.  Furthermore, the presence of substituents or nearby cations strongly influences the conformation.

See also
 Azepine
 Pyrrole
 Cyclononatetraene
 (2Z,4Z,6Z,8Z)-Thionine
 Oxonine

References

Nitrogen heterocycles
Simple aromatic rings
Heterocyclic compounds with 1 ring
Nine-membered rings